Líza Morózova (born May 4, 1973) is a Russian female artist (performance art, installation art, body art), psychologist (Candidate of Sciences, PhD Level), art therapist and columnist. Participant of more than 150 international art exhibitions and biennale in 17 countries. She lives in Moscow.

References

Further reading

In English
 Liza Morozova end her project “To be left-handed together” (performance, installation) on an official website of the exhibition “Impossible Community”

In Russian
 Liza Morozova on a site www.gif.ru
 Interview with Liza Morozova: "Whether is possible performance art today?"
 OpenSpace.Ru – Column of Liza Morozova "Performance Around Us with Liza Morozova"

1973 births
Living people
Artists from Moscow
Russian contemporary artists
Russian women artists
Body art
Russian performance artists
Psychologists from Moscow
Russian women psychologists